Harry Jacob Parrish (February 19, 1922 – March 28, 2006) was a longtime member of the Virginia House of Delegates at the time of his death. Born February 19, 1922, Parrish served as a colonel in the United States Air Force from 1942 and 1946 before being elected to the town council of Manassas, Virginia in 1951. He held that position until 1963, when he was elected mayor; he served in that capacity until 1981. Parrish became a delegate in 1982. He was also chairman of the board of the Manassas Ice and Fuel Company, Inc.

References

Historical Bio for Harry J. Parrish.

1922 births
2006 deaths
Members of the Virginia House of Delegates
Mayors of places in Virginia
People from Manassas, Virginia
20th-century American politicians
21st-century American politicians
Virginia city council members
United States Army Air Forces personnel of World War II
United States Army Air Forces officers
United States Air Force personnel of the Korean War
United States Air Force personnel of the Vietnam War
United States Air Force colonels